Michael Gross is a  television editor, writer, producer and director. He lives and works in Seattle, Washington. He has worked on a number of television programs, including Bill Nye the Science Guy, Beakman's World, Adventure Divas, and Bands Reunited. Gross has won nine Daytime Emmy Awards.

References

Daytime Emmy Award winners
Living people
American television editors
Year of birth missing (living people)
Place of birth missing (living people)
People from Seattle